The following television stations broadcast on digital channel 48 in the United States:

 K48GV-D in Laketown, etc., Utah, on virtual channel 13, which rebroadcasts KSTU
 K48KJ-D in Geneva, Minnesota, to move to channel 21
 KHVM-LD in Minneapolis, Minnesota, to move to channel 18, on virtual channel 48

The following television stations, which are no longer licensed, formerly broadcast on digital channel 48 in the United States:
 K48GI-D in Flagstaff, Arizona
 K48IJ-D in Preston, Idaho
 K48JH-D in Capulin, etc., New Mexico
 K48LL-D in Kingsville-Alice, Texas
 K48MH-D in Roswell, New Mexico
 K48NU-D in Beaumont, Texas
 K48NY-D in Gainesville, Texas
 K48OQ-D in Lowry, South Dakota
 KDMK-LD in Lafayette, Louisiana
 W48DT-D in Guayanilla, Puerto Rico

References

48 digital TV stations in the United States